This is a list of notable ice cream flavors. Ice cream is a frozen dessert usually made from dairy products, such as milk and cream, and often combined with fruits or other ingredients and flavors. Most varieties contain sugar, although some are made with other sweeteners.

Ice cream flavors

 Bacon – a modern invention, generally created by adding bacon to egg custard and freezing the mixture
 Banana
 Beer
 Blue moon – an ice cream flavor with bright blue coloring, available in the Upper Midwest of the United States
 Bubblegum
 Butter Brickle was the registered trademark of a toffee ice cream flavoring and of a toffee-centered chocolate-covered candy bar similar to the Heath bar, introduced by the Blackstone Hotel in Omaha, Nebraska, in the 1920s. Alternately, it is often prepared and sold as butter vanilla flavored ice cream with tiny flecks of butter toffee instead of chunks of Heath bar.
 Butterscotch
 Butter pecan is a smooth vanilla ice cream with a slight buttery flavor, with pecans added.
 Carrot
 Cheese
 Cake batter
 Cherry – includes variations (e.g. Amaretto cherry, black cherry)
 Chocolate
 Chocolate chip cookie dough
 Coffee
 Cinnamon apple
 Cookies and cream
 Cotton candy
 Crab – a Japanese creation, it is described as having a sweet taste; the island of Hokkaido, Japan, is known for manufacturing it
 Creole cream cheese
 Dulce de leche
Earl Grey
 Eggnog
 French vanilla
Garlic
 Grape
 Green tea
 Halva
 Hokey pokey – a flavour of ice cream in New Zealand, consisting of plain vanilla ice cream with small, solid lumps of honeycomb toffee
 Lucuma – a popular Peruvian ice cream flavor with an orange color and a sweet nutty taste
 Mamey
 Mango
 Maple
 Mint chocolate chip – composed of mint ice cream with small chocolate chips. In some cases the liqueur crème de menthe is used to provide the mint flavor, but in most cases peppermint or spearmint flavoring is used.
 Moon mist – a blend of grape, banana, and blue raspberry (or sometimes bubblegum) flavors, popular in Atlantic Canada. The flavors are generally blended together to give a mist-like texture.
 Moose tracks
 Neapolitan – composed of vanilla, chocolate and strawberry ice cream together side by side
 Oyster
Pistachio
Peanut butter
 Raspberry ripple – consists of raspberry syrup injected into vanilla ice cream.
 Rocky road – although there are variations from the original flavor, it is traditionally composed of chocolate ice cream, nuts, and whole or diced marshmallows, or sometimes replaced with marshmallow creme, a more fluid version
 Rum raisin
 Spumoni – a molded Italian ice cream made with layers of different colors and flavors, usually containing candied fruits and nuts.
 Strawberry
 Strawberry cheesecake
 Superman
 Teaberry – a flavor particular to Pennsylvania, with a flavor similar to wintergreen
 Tiger tail – a flavor popular in Canada, consisting of orange-flavored ice cream with swirls of black licorice
 Tutti frutti
 Twist – soft-serve ice cream where two flavors (if unspecified, usually chocolate and vanilla) are extruded simultaneously
 Ube (purple yam) – a popular ice cream flavor in the Philippines
 Vanilla
 Watermelon

Gallery

See also

 List of dairy products
 List of desserts
 List of ice cream brands
 List of ice cream parlor chains
 List of soft drink flavors

References

External links
 

Dessert-related lists